In the 16th century, the Renaissance, which called for a return to the models of Roman antiquity, spread throughout Europe from Italy, notably through treatises and engravings referring to the treatise De architectura by Vitruvius (90–20 BC), Roman theorist of ancient architecture. Each center of culture and creation reinterpreted these new references according to its local traditions.

At the beginning of the 16th century Toulouse was experiencing a prosperous period. It was the third largest city in France, a rich and powerful provincial capital that the woad trade was providing with merchants of international stature. The city was also the seat of the first French provincial parliament, whose jurisdiction extended from the Rhône to Gascony, of a university renowned even beyond the borders (mainly in law), and of a large archbishopric in which the church of Saint-Sernin was considered one of the holiest places in the world.

These factors of dynamism fostered a deep humanist impulse, affirmed the city's role as a radiant artistic place and maintained a climate of social emulation in which it was important to be visible. These characteristics of the Toulouse Renaissance can be found in the richness and quality of its architecture, fortunately largely preserved but perhaps difficult to apprehend in its entirety because it is somewhat scattered throughout the vast perimeter of the historical centre and moreover partially hidden in courtyards not easily accessible to the public.

It is therefore the purpose of this article to bring together and to present the various elements of the Renaissance architecture of Toulouse, which earned the city to be described as "the most beautiful city in France" by the scholar Joseph Justus Scaliger at the end of the sixteenth century.

Architecture as a support for municipal ambitions 

A home of erudition and humanism, Toulouse welcomed the Renaissance and looked back on its prestigious ancient past of which there were few visible remains, the ancient Roman monuments having served as "brick quarries" throughout the Middle Ages. At the request of the capitouls (the city's chief magistrates) scholars such as Nicolas Bertrand, Guillaume de La Perrière and Antoine Noguier revived the Palladia Tolosa evoked by the Latin poets Martial, Ausonius and Sidonius Apollinaris, the ancient Toulouse placed by emperor Domitian under the patronage of the goddess Pallas (Minerva) presented as the protector of arts and letters. In 1522, at the instigation of the clerk Pierre Salamon, the municipal palace of capitulum (chapter) became Capitolium (Capitol), reflecting the desire to imitate Rome and its ancient references.

These idealized links between the municipal institution of Toulouse and Ancient Rome found expression in the arts and in particular in architecture.

The towers of the former Capitole

The Capitole Archive Tower 
Fearing an invasion of Languedoc by the Spanish army of Charles V who was maneuvering in the Pyrenees, and concerned to protect their gunpowder reserve and their precious archives, the capitouls built between 1525 and 1530 by Laurent Clary a tower then called "Archive tower", which is now called "the Keep" (le Donjon in French) for its fortified appearance. On the ground floor was the "Small Consistory", a prestigious room where the capitouls held their private meetings.

On a façade of this tower, in a stone frame arranged in the manner of an ancient temple whose column capitals implement the superimposition of the Doric and Ionic orders, the capitouls presented themselves as Roman consuls. The Latin inscription engraved in the stone announces: FIEBAT ANNO CHRISTIANAE SALUTIS MDXXV IDIBS NOVEBR NOBILIBUS PREINSIGNITIS CAPITOLINIS DECURIONIBUS, which means "Was made the year of salvation 1525, at the ides of November, by the noble and very distinguished decurions of the Capitol". By posing as "decurions" sitting in a "Capitol", the capitouls of the Renaissance hoped to put forward a historical legitimacy which they claimed dated back to antiquity and exceeded that of the kings of France, in the face of a royal administration and a Parliament that tended more and more to limit their prerogatives and the municipal liberties they had conquered.

On the roof of the Archive tower stood between 1550 and 1829 a gilded bronze statue named Lady Tholose (Dame Tholose in French), work of the sculptor Jean Rancy and the foundryman Claude Pelhot, and exceptional personification, under the features of the goddess Pallas Athena, of the city and the values which ensured its cohesion around the municipal magistrates. Toulouse took advantage of the presence of its large arsenal to cast this large statue, a first in France outside the king's workshops. No one, not even in Italy, had then ventured to such a dynamic work, encamped on one supporting leg (Giambologna made his Flying Mercury more than fifteen years later). Lady Tholose is also distinguished by the mastery of the wet drapery, the science of gestures, twists and multiple points of vision that Jean Rancy showed early on. The statue held a weather vane in her right hand and leaned with her left hand on a shield with the arms of the city. On the shield were inscribed the letters CPQT MDL, that is to say Capitulum Populusque Tolosanum 1550, the "Capitoulate and the people of Toulouse" which, in the manner of the Roman SPQR, referred to Rome and to the idea of an urban republic, the capitouls boasting of sitting within a Capitol.

The Tour de la Vis (destroyed in 1885) 
Although the Archive Tower is still of Gothic architecture, with the exception of the decorative elements presented in the previous chapter, the Tour de la Vis, which was added to it a few years later, was an important milestone of Renaissance architecture in Toulouse until its destruction in 1885.

Erected between 1532 and 1542, this stair tower was intended to replace the external wooden staircase that served the upper floor of the Archive Tower. A massive square construction, it contained a suspended staircase of 61 steps considered to be an architectural masterpiece with its helical vault, hollowed out in the centre and supported only on the perimeter of the building.

It was the master mason Sébastien Bouguereau who built this remarkable staircase, one of the first attempts of the Renaissance to replace spiral staircases. This example remained unique in Toulouse, where the straight staircase supported by a dividing wall, less complex to build, was later preferred. This feat of stereotomy, which was inspired by Spanish achievements (Bouguereau having worked in that country), was the first known suspended staircase in France; the formula was not found in Paris until a century later (after 1640) before it then returned to the province.

Translated with www.DeepL.com/Translator (free version)

In 1885 the municipality decided to demolish it because it masked the perspective of the new rear facade of the Capitole.

The Henry IV courtyard of the Capitole and its triumphal portal

The Henry IV courtyard 
The Henri IV courtyard of the Capitole was built between 1602 and 1609 by the architect Pierre Souffron. It is characterised by a brick and stone polychromy, a composition that influenced the later constructions of the municipal palace. The ground floor arcades were built by Dominique Capmartin and Jean Bordes, while upstairs galleries were built to accommodate prestigious rooms, such as the one for the maintainers of the Floral Games, richly decorated with coats of arms and flowers painted by Jean Chalette, embryo of the first Hall of Illustrious Men.

In 1606 the Parliament of Toulouse caused difficulties regarding these works, and the capitouls turned to King Henry IV for authorisation to continue them, which he accepted on condition that his marble statue be placed there and that the north gallery be named "Gallery Henry IV, King of France and Navarre".

On the galleries with superimposed orders, the capitouls of 1605 had the city's and the king's arms and coats of arms placed, which had been damaged by the revolutionaries but were restored in 1873. The portal to the west dates from 1576, but it was transformed in 1607, then reworked again in 1676 and enriched with two female figures with lamb and owl representing Pallas / Lady Tholose, works by sculptor Philibert Chaillon.

The triumphal portal 
The triumphal portal of the Henri IV courtyard is a superimposition of various parts successively made by Toulouse Renaissance artists. It was erected on its present site in the early years of the 17th century at the same time as the Henry IV courtyard was built. It is the support of a symbolic language highlighting the greatness of the city and, for its upper part, of the French Crown.

The lower part of the portal was designed by the architect and sculptor Nicolas Bachelier in 1546 on a drawing by Jean Rancy. It originally adorned the vestibule of the Grand Consistory and represents the goddess Pallas, protector of the city in Roman times. It was a prestigious tutelary figure brought to the fore by the capitouls of the Renaissance. Pallas is here surrounded by two winged women: one carrying a staff with the cross of Toulouse (originally it was an owl, an attribute of Pallas), the other brandishing a laurel wreath and a flowering branch.

The middle part of the portal was sculpted by Geoffroy Jarry in 1561, it shows enslaved prisoners surrounding the coat of arms of Toulouse, to symbolise the power of the city as capital of the province of Languedoc. Beneath the sculptures, an inscription added in 1771 announces in Latin the importance of the place: HIC THEMIS DAT JURA CIVIBUS, APOLLO FLORES CAMŒNIS, MINERVA PALMAS ARTIBUS, "Here Themis gives the law to the citizens, Apollo the flowers to the poets, Minerva the palms to the artists".

The upper part of the portal, decorated with the names and coats of arms of the capitouls of the year, is organised around a marble statue of Henry IV, the work of Thomas Heurtematte (1607). The only statue of the king made during his lifetime, it testifies to the Crown's desire to restore the political image of the King of France in an ultra-Catholic city that a few years earlier had violently opposed his accession to the throne. The king is camped laurelled and in armour to exalt his military power and to pose as a peacemaker and protector of Christendom.

The Griffoul fountain 
As early as 1545, the capitouls undertook major works to restore to working order an ancient Roman aqueduct that led the waters of a high hill to the site of the cathedral. A first public fountain was installed by the sculptor Jean Rancy in 1549, replaced in 1593 by some of the elements of the current fountain: an obelisk in red marble from Cierp (in the Pyrenees), placed on a pedestal dug out of four niches housing bronze children each holding a ewer and urinating like the Manneken-Pis. In 1649, vandalized, they were restored by Pierre Affre who replaced the ewers by snakes. It is only in the 19th century that the children were slightly modified so as not to offend against modesty. Other elements were added or replaced over the centuries (as illustrated by the multiplication of dates on the various parts of the fountain).

Symbol of the capitouls' euergetism, during centuries this fountain was the only one to give water in Toulouse, supplemented by wells (often infected) and water carriers getting their supplies from the Garonne river. The spectacular wear of its stone coping testifies to its prolonged and intensive use.

Pont-Neuf 

Throughout its history, Toulouse was the rear base for military operations against Spain and for the troops that guarded the border. For this reason the city was, for example, equipped with a large arsenal.

It was in 1541, under the impulse of King Francis I, who had some reason to be wary of the conquering Spain of Charles V, that the construction of the Pont-Neuf was decided upon with the strategic aim of ensuring the passage of troops from one side of the Garonne to the other in all weathers. The king authorized the levying of a special tax on the region for this purpose, but money often ran out and its construction, which began before 1545, was not completed until 1632.

The great masters active in Toulouse at the beginning of the construction site, the sculptor Jean Rancy, the painter Bernard Nalot, the architects Louis Privat, Nicolas Bachelier, and then Dominique Bertin and Dominique Bachelier worked alongside experts in hydraulic engineering who were called in to develop new foundation processes in aquatic environments. Later, Pierre Souffron met the young Jacques Lemercier and François Mansart. This construction site was therefore a place of emulation, exchange and training, with a national and even European influence: at the request of King Philip II of Spain, Dominique Bachelier went to Saragossa in 1584 to repair the bridge linking the banks of the Ebro River. The Pont-Neuf proved its solidity and the relevance of the technical solutions adopted by being the only bridge in Toulouse to withstand the great flood of the Garonne in 1875.

The architect Jacques Lemercier, who gave a decisive impulse to the construction and generalized the vast basket-handle arches allowing to cross the river without excessive difference in level, made the synthesis between bridges of the Roman antiquity, for the use of the superimposed spouts intended to spread the water and for the openings on the piers, and works of the Italian Renaissance such as the ponte Sisto in Rome for its oculus or the ponte Santa Trinita in Florence for the lowering of the arches. Finally, by removing the housing on the bridge, it has definitively broken with the past, delivering the entire deck to traffic, as at the Pont Neuf in Paris and the Châtellerault Bridge. With them, the Toulouse bridge belongs to a new generation of innovative structures.

The Pont-Neuf was therefore the great ambition of the Toulouse Renaissance, both because of the scale and difficulty of the project and for the skills gathered over nearly a century, which made the site an exceptional human and technical adventure. Its symbolic importance was exploited by the royal power: Henry IV wanted to exhibit his sculpted effigy, while the equestrian portrait of Louis XIII crowned the triumphal arch that stood until the 19th century at the entrance of the bridge, on the left bank.

Hôtels particuliers 
In France, and contrary to Italy for example, the term "palace" is generally reserved for the residences of kings or princes. The urban residences of the elite of non-royal descent are therefore often referred to as "hôtels particuliers". But these hôtels can be of very different sizes and natures, designating the homes of wealthy bourgeois as well as those of the high nobility. It is therefore generally accepted that they can be described as townhouses of a grand sort.

The hôtels particuliers of the Toulouse Renaissance were for the most part built by Nobles of the Robe linked to the Parliament of Toulouse, and by merchants enriched by the international woad trade who sought ennoblement by becoming capitouls.

It was through the diffusion of engravings of the monuments of Rome as well as the publication of architectural treatises such as those of Serlio, Alberti or Vitruvius, that the Renaissance architectural vocabulary that had developed in Italy during the Quattrocento (15th century) made its appearance in the private architecture of Toulouse from the first decades of the 16th century. Initially characterised by a French First Renaissance decor inspired by the Loire Valley, it then moved on a classical development which flourished spectacularly at the Hôtel d'Assézat. At the same time, Mannerist influences from the royal castles of Madrid, the Louvre and Fontainebleau influenced Toulouse's architecture until the years 1610–1620.

Architects such as Louis Privat, Nicolas Bachelier, then Dominique Bachelier, Dominique Bertin and Pierre Souffron built prestigious hotels for demanding clients who expected them to be up to date with the latest innovations, with particular attention to royal fashion.

However, architects were not the only ones to have an understanding of architectural culture, and personalities from Toulouse's humanist milieu also worked on the building sites. The jurisconsult Jean de Boyssoné, his cousin Jean Albert, prior of La Réole, and the poet and man of law Pierre Trassebot distinguished themselves by their conception of architecture "à l'antique". Years before Serlio's first publications (1537), Sagredo's translation into French (1536) or Philibert Delorme's achievements in Lyon (1536), which are reputed to have been at the origin of the diffusion of classical architecture in France, the humanist Jean de Pins, bishop of Rieux and brilliant diplomat, made the first use of the architectural orders in Toulouse (Ionic order) in the construction of his hôtel.

Renowned for the quality of their architecture, the hôtels particuliers of the Toulouse Renaissance that have survived to the present day testify to the vitality and evolution of architectural tastes in Toulouse over more than a century (around 1515–1620).

Hôtel de Bernuy 

Jean de Bernuy came to Toulouse from Burgos to start trading in woad at the end of the 15th century, and was so successful that in 1502 he launched the first campaign of work on his hotel, leading in particular to the erection of the beautiful Gothic stair tower. In 1530, a second campaign was entrusted to the architect Louis Privat. He abundantly developed the language of the Renaissance in a second courtyard where he succeeded, in the words of the historian Paul Mesplé, "in bringing Spain, Italy and the Loire to life under the Toulouse sky".

The architecture of this stone Renaissance courtyard is dominated by the presence of an extraordinary coffered low vault, a true piece of bravery, whose coffered walls and hanging roses do not follow the curvature of the vault but are strictly vertical, an effect that must have made the stonemason's work considerably more difficult.

Inspired by models from Italy and the Loire Valley, the long candelabra columns omnipresent in the main courtyard are also close to models given in the treatise Las Medidas del Romano by the Spanish architect Diego de Sagredo, published in 1526 (and in 1536 for the French version). They confer an exceptional monumentality to the courtyard, whose upper gallery also presents, for the first time in Toulouse, Corinthian columns whose design is taken from an architectural treatise.

Considered a magnificent example of the introduction of the Renaissance in Toulouse and a symbol of the opulence of the city, this courtyard of the Hôtel de Bernuy has been partially reproduced at the Architecture and Heritage Campus in Paris to illustrate the style of the French First Renaissance.

Hôtel d'Assézat 

Pierre d'Assézat made his fortune in the woad trade, of which he became one of the main international merchants. Because of its dimensions, its exceptional decoration and its pristine condition, his hotel is mentioned in every overview of the French Renaissance.

It was the stonemason Jean Castagné and the architect Nicolas Bachelier who carried out the first campaign of works in 1555–1557. The layout of the façades, featuring twin columns which develop regularly over three floors where the Doric, Ionic and Corinthian orders are superimposed, is inspired by great antique models such as the Colosseum, but also by the treatises of the royal architect Serlio. The design of the capitals systematically reproduces the most sophisticated antique expression known.

Interrupted by the death of Bachelier (1556) and then Castagnié (1557), the site was taken over in 1560 by Dominique Bachelier, son of Nicolas. Favouring the aesthetics of Mannerist architecture and the play of polychrome brick and stone, he closed the courtyard by creating the loggia and the passageway. The latter, supported by large, richly decorated consoles, is punctuated by arches decorated with diamond-shaped stone points.

Dominique Bachelier also designed the monumental entrance portal, taken from Serlio's Extraordinary Book. The Doric pilasters decorated with stone diamonds and the delicately decorated Ionic pilasters around the mullioned window give the whole a precious dimension, evoking both power and delicate erudition.

Hôtel du Vieux-Raisin 

In 1515 the lawyer and capitoul Béringuier Maynier acquired a 15th-century hotel. On a new dwelling framed by two stair towers extended by two short wings (first span of the present wings), he had many windows richly decorated with pilasters, candelabras and scrolls placed. Busts in medallions decorate the large stair tower. In the hotel, a ceremonial fireplace honours the great humanist culture of the owner, its decoration is an apology of fortune, abundance and fertility.

In 1547, the Member of Parliament Jean de Burnet acquired the hotel from Béringuier Maynier. Between 1547 and 1577 he enlarged the courtyard of honour and gave it a square shape with the extension of the wings (beyond the first bay). It is closed by a portico whose Doric columns and alternating brick and stone are inspired by the loggia of Assézat.

Finally, between 1580 and 1591 the bishop Pierre de Lancrau, who became the owner, heightened the great staircase tower and built several windows featuring telamons, although it is difficult to know with certainty which windows are from the second work campaign and which are from the third.

In the courtyard, some of the telamon windows on the first floor could be the work of Nicolas Bachelier, while those on the ground floor would be from the third campaign (end of the 16th century). The telamons and caryatids decorating the windows are remarkable for their diversity and realism, on the ground floor their tense musculatures seem to have difficulty carrying the entablature of the bays, on the ground floor the hybrid figures with lion's paws or pilasters display great anatomical and psychological realism. Other sculpted motifs abound in the frames and refer to the decor of royal buildings such as the Francis I Gallery in Fontainebleau, and are sometimes even inspired by famous works by Benvenuto Cellini and Michelangelo.

Hôtel de Bagis, then de Clary 

In 1538, the architect Nicolas Bachelier and the mason Antoine Lescalle, assisted in the design of the project by the prior of La Réole, Jean Albert, were entrusted with the construction of his hotel by the parliamentarian Jean de Bagis. Classical ideals dictate the symmetry of the façades and the regularity of the square courtyard. The stone bays are of an increasingly complete Doric order throughout the levels, the novelty of which made all the more impression in Toulouse as Jean de Bagis, a member of the King's Grand Council, was one of the most important figures in the city.

At the heart of the dwelling is a straight staircase, one of the first in Toulouse after that of the Hotel d'Ulmo. A portal with splendid telamons marks its entrance, they have long been attributed to Nicolas Bachelier because of their expressiveness and quality of execution, but their dating is still under discussion and still at the heart of current research.

At the beginning of the 17th century, François de Clary, First President of the Parliament, and his wife bought the Hôtel de Bagis, which was then called Hôtel de Clary. The architect Pierre Souffron, assisted by the sculptors Pierre Bouc, Pierre Monge and Thomas Heurtematte, built a stone façade unique in the city during the Renaissance, with a symmetrical composition of eight bays and colossal pilasters. Above the portal, Apollo, Mercury, Juno and Minerva celebrate the couple of owners in a richly sculpted decoration.

This spectacular façade earned the house its nickname of "stone hotel" (hôtel de pierre in French), and its owner the reputation of having misappropriated for his own benefit the stones intended for the construction of the Pont-Neuf, which he supervised.

In the courtyard, complementing the older composition of the Hotel de Bagis, the rich Mannerist ornaments on the east and south façades of the courtyard, with their marble inlays and abundant carved decoration, also date from the early 17th century.

Other Renaissance hotels 
See also : 

After a brilliant career in Italy as ambassador from 1515 to 1522, the prelate and humanist Jean de Pins had his hotel built from 1528 to 1530. Composed of two main buildings and superimposed galleries, the hotel of Jean de Pins was inspired by what he had seen in Italy, notably breaking with the Toulouse tradition of the great staircase tower in favour of galleries with arcades and a garden. A precursor to the introduction of the classical orders in France, Jean de Pins had Ionic pilasters carved from the engraving of a treatise by Cesariano (published in Italy in 1521) devoted to the ancient architecture he had probably come across during his stay in Milan. The decoration is enriched with medallion portraits celebrating the human figure and evoking the coins and medals of Roman emperors collected by Renaissance humanists.

Built between 1526 and 1536, the Hôtel d'Ulmo was the first in Toulouse to adopt a straight staircase rather than a spiral staircase. This changed the whole organisation of the house, which was then built around this central axis.

Built in 1540 for the parliamentarian Guillaume de La Mamye, the Hotel de Lamamye was the first in Toulouse to implement the superimposition of the three classical orders: large Doric, Ionic and then Corinthian columns follow one another at each level of the elevation, recalling prestigious Roman monuments such as the Colosseum or the Theater of Marcellus.

Hôtel Molinier was built between 1550 and 1556 by the parliamentarian Gaspard Molinier. It is particularly noteworthy for its Mannerist portal of 1556 designed after a model from Serlio's Extraordinary Book of 1551, which testifies to the speed with which prestigious models could be adapted to Toulouse. This monumental gate is surmounted with numerous sculptures, including monstruous beings and marble inlays. This ensemble corresponds to the then-new style known today as mannerism, whose principal traits are an abundance of sculpted figures, the depiction of a fantastic bestiary, and a marked taste for relief and polychromatic interplays. The taste for marble inlays in architecture would endure until the start of the following century. The quarries of the Pyrenees were the source of this precious material which, from Toulouse, was sent to royal building projects, such as the Louvre. The sculptor drew inspiration from the engravings of Marcantonio Raimondi and the works of the royal architect Sebastiano Serlio.

In total, more than twenty Renaissance hotels (or significant remains of hotels) have survived to the present day, testifying to the taste of the Toulouse elites of the 16th and early 17th centuries for Renaissance architecture.

Gates and windows

Doors and portals 
Preferred communication media for private or institutional owners who wished to display their importance, doors and portals were generally the object of all decorative care. The great diversity of Renaissance doors and portals in Toulouse reveals a multitude of sources and influences testifying to more than a century of Renaissance architecture.

Among the first doors of the Toulouse Renaissance, the door of the stair tower of the Hôtel du Vieux-Raisin (1515–1528) displays the profiles of the owner and his wife, represented in a medallion, and is enriched with a Latin motto within a décor of putti and scrolls. The decoration on the door of the Tournoer Tower (1532) depicts a funerary urn framed by two lions facing each other, in memory of the owner's son who died shortly before.

The portal of the Dalbade church was made by the stonemason Michel Colin. For the lower part (1537–1539) he was inspired by the Loire Valley, but the construction took place at a pivotal time when the style of the French First Renaissance faded in the face of architectural orders. Also for the upper part, built from 1540 onwards, classical columns and capitals replaced the composite and figured capitals or the scrolls, giving the portal a more monumental style.

The dating of the portal with telamons in the courtyard of the Hôtel de Bagis, an emblematic work of the Toulouse Renaissance, is still debated for lack of documentary sources. Initially associated with the campaign of Nicolas Bachelier (1538) and then with the 1545s because of its resemblance to a 1539 engraving of Serlio's "Regole generali", it has also been attributed to the workshop of Pierre Souffron (around 1606) because of the renovation of the perron and the upheaval of the courtyard of honour at that time. More recently the decade 1550 has been proposed because elements (base and sheath of the telamons, anatomical treatment...) are similar to mantelpieces of the Madrid Castle sculpted after 1540, engravings of which were circulated by Androuet du Cerceau in the 1550s.

The many doors of the former town hall, a complex of buildings built mainly in the 16th and 17th centuries, were an opportunity for the capitouls to leave a trace of their time at the head of the municipal administration. Their short one-year term of office did not usually encourage them to embark on large-scale projects on which they could not have had their coats of arms carved (the monumental facade, the Henri IV courtyard and the Archive tower are exceptions in this respect), but the doors could be made in this period of time by a skilled craftsman with all the desired ornamentation and, above all, with room for the coats of arms of the sitting consuls. Only a few examples of these doors of the Capitole have survived, and they suffered both from revolutionary censorship (destruction of coats of arms) and from a 19th century that saw the almost total reconstruction of the municipal palace. Among these surviving doors, the Grand Consistory door had a singular destiny: built in 1552-1553 by Guiraud Mellot, who sculpted the coats of arms of the capitouls of the year 1552, it was transformed in 1628 by the addition of a stucco decoration to commemorate the capture of La Rochelle and to honour Richelieu, whose visit to Toulouse was expected. The capitouls of the year took advantage of the operation to have the original capitular coat of arms covered with their own. This indelicacy had the merit of preserving the coats of arms of the capitouls of 1552 from the revolutionary destruction of 1793, which fell on the 1628 coat of arms. Rediscovered under the layer of stucco during the dismantling of the door in 1880, the 1552 armorial is displayed again on this door of the Capitole which throne since 1932 at the Louvre museum within the collections of sculptures.

The portal of the former Esquile College is the work of Nicolas Bachelier (1556). It celebrates the refoundation of this former medieval college, which in 1550 absorbed eight old colleges. The rustic vermiculated bossing evokes solidity and venerable antiquity. Inspired by compositions from Serlio's Extraordinary Book, it features various emblems hammered at the time of the Revolution.

The portal of the Hotel Molinier (1556) was inspired by an engraving of Sebastiano Serlio's Extraordinary Book, published in Lyon only five years earlier. This shows how quickly the new prestigious models were adapted to Toulouse during the Renaissance. Built for the parliamentary councillor Gaspard de Molinier, it presents a majestic composition between elaborate architecture, sophisticated sculptures and sumptuous polychromies of stone and marble. The paired, fluted and filleted columns are crowned with Corinthian capitals that refer to Roman models such as the Pantheon or the Temple of Mars Ultor, engravings of which were given by Alberti, Labacco or Jean Martin in publications that were published in Italy and France between 1550 and 1553. As an additional enrichment, the capitals are covered with laurel leaves, which are less rigid and dry than acanthus leaves, as was the case on many ancient remains, but also on the contemporary sites of the Louvre and Écouen. The hybrid beings that develop on the attic are inspired by the palace of Fontainebleau. Two half-human, half-plant figures, one female and the other male, are inspired by an engraving of 1536 by Veneziano, reproduced by Androuet du Cerceau between 1546 and 1549. Another important element of the decoration is the setting of dozens of plaques, cabochons, half-spheres or diamond points made of coloured marble from the Pyrenean quarries. These rare and precious marbles are the work of the architect, engineer and carpenter Dominique Bertin, who reopened Roman quarries in the Pyrenees to supply the royal building sites. Despite the distance from the royal court, the responsiveness and sophistication of Toulouse's artistic milieu as displayed on the portal of the Hôtel de Molinier are not surprising, as Bertin, but probably also other Toulousans such as Jean Rancy, who had designed marble columns and decorations for the Capitole (never realized), frequented the great royal architects of the reign of Henri II (Lescot, Primaticcio, De L'Orme...) and thus kept abreast of the latest developments. This ostentatious decoration was topped by the upper part of the portal, which bears the Stoic motto SUSTINE ET ABSTINE, "Bear, and forbear", which the jurisconsult Jean de Coras, an illustrious professor of law at the University of Toulouse, interpreted as guiding a man towards virtue by teaching him patience, the ability to endure hardship, and by inculcating temperance. Two sculpted ewers under the motto, traditionally symbols of these qualities as well as abstinence, reinforce the message of the parliamentarian's honesty and integrity. Thus the ambitious decorative programme of this portal, rich in symbols and references, presented several levels of reading, some of which were only accessible to the most erudite. Designed to express the owner's honourability and moral standards, the portal of the Hôtel de Molinier bears witness to the fact that at that time, in architecture as in rhetoric, "any discourse that tended towards greatness required wealth and abundance".

The door of the stair tower of the Hotel d'Assézat (1555–1557 or/and after 1560) was the main entrance to the hotel. Flanked by large Doric columns which ensure continuity with the classical facades surrounding it, it is decorated with two twisted columns which are perhaps a reference to King Charles IX (whose symbol was two intertwined columns) or to the mythical columns of Solomon's temple.

The large portal of the Hôtel d'Assézat (1560–1562), a mixture of power and delicate erudition, is the work of Dominique Bachelier, son of the famous Nicolas Bachelier, author of the classical facades of the courtyard of this same hotel a few years earlier. The Doric pilasters that frame the door offer an alternating succession of diamond points, giving the whole a precious dimension.

Dating from 1604 or 1605, the large portal of the Jesuit college was admired by Rodin, who drew it several times. The decoration carved in stone bore the coats of arms of the eight capitouls of the year as well as the double coats of arms of France-Navarre on the left and Toulouse-Languedoc on the right, although only four of the capitouls' coats of arms are still clearly visible.

The portal of the Hôtel de Clary, or “stone hotel” (1610–1616), is only double in appearance: the door on the right is a false door created solely for reasons of symmetry. Above the doors, Mercury and Apollo on the left, Juno and Minerva on the right, celebrate the owners in a richly carved mannerist decoration.

Built from 1617 onwards, the Hôtel de Chalvet is representative of a change of style which was to leave its mark on the architecture of 17th century Toulouse: the sculpted decoration is abandoned in favour of austerity only brightened up on the openings by alternating brick and stone. Only its portal with bosses is still inspired by Renaissance references, and it was one of the last to do so with the spectacular portal of the Hôtel Desplats (around 1620–1622).

The ornate windows 

Together with the gate, the most obvious sign of an owner's social status was the carved window. The use of stone on a brick background highlights these openings, which, as in Italy, constitute isolated motifs. The break with the flamboyant Gothic style was expressed by the term "à l'antique" (meaning in the antique-like style) used in the construction contracts, but this formulation actually covered a wide range of solutions that were constantly evolving.

The ornamental vocabulary of the first Renaissance (scrolls, medallions, putti) was replaced in 1538 by the "fenestre à l'antique" (antique window) installed by the architect and stonemason Nicolas Bachelier at the Hôtel de Bagis. On this occasion, Bachelier proceeded to a progressive representation of the Doric order, increasingly complete throughout the levels, making each window a miniature temple in the ancient style. Modernizing the window with superimposed columns from Italy, he took over the position of the quarter candelabra in the windows of the Hôtel du Vieux-Raisin by inserting a quarter Doric column in the spandrel. Rather than superimpose two small columns, Bachelier preferred to use the height of the bay to present a complete Doric order by placing a triglyph of elongated proportions on the small column, thus giving the opening, topped by an imposing cornice, a greater monumentality.

This formula of the "antique window" developed by Bachelier at the Hôtel de Bagis was taken up by himself in 1540–1544 at the Hôtel de Guillaume de Bernuy. The use of tables furnished with Mannerist decorations inspired by the School of Fontainebleau adds sophistication to the framing.

This model was once again taken up on the windows that in 1546 Jean Cheverry had built on the new buildings of the 15th century Hôtel de Boysson, with Doric or Ionic columns. Cheverry also modernised the appearance of the medieval staircase tower by inserting a window on the first floor decorated with terms, half man, half column, taken from ancient architecture. Above these, pilasters feature an engraving by Serlio inspired by a pulpit in the Roman Archbasilica of Saint John Lateran.

This desire to imitate the windows of a great parliamentarian can be seen as a strategy for appropriating the taste of the city's most important figures (Jean de Bagis was also a member of the King's Great Council), appreciated by the merchants in full social ascent and in search of recognition.

Responding to a logic of honorary re-appropriation, this type of imitation was practised throughout the century. The merchant Jean Astorg proceeded in this way when, around 1562, in order to decorate the windows of his new building at the back of the courtyard, he had the windows of his neighbour, Pierre Delpech (1554–1560), an influential member of the Catholic League particularly involved in the fight against the Protestants, imitated. These windows have a frame known in French as a "chambranle à crossettes", supported by four short pilaster. These do not play a supporting role, but rather appear suspended and dependent on the frame they are supposed to support.

Some of the windows of the Hôtel de Massas (or Hôtel d'Aldéguier) were designed based on the engraved models of the Extraordinary Book by the royal architect Sebastiano Serlio. An edition of this book, kept in Paris, contains a sheet of drawings by the architect of the Hôtel de Massas. They detail the designer's reflections on the profiles of the courtyard windows and their decoration based on the models engraved by Serlio. They are most certainly the work of Nicolas Bachelier's son, Dominique, who was one of the great builders of the second half of the 16th century. This sheet of sketches tells us about the taste and preferences of an architect for the extraordinary shapes he creates, mixes and combines to his liking. It is the oldest surviving record of the graphic invention of a French architect-artist.

The windows of the house of Élie Géraud, master goldsmith, are more modest as they are made of wood and placed on a half-timbered house. They reflect the desire to imitate the stone framed windows of hôtels particuliers.

The astonishing stylistic diversity of Toulouse's Renaissance windows reveals both the influence of numerous prestigious formal sources and the abundant creativity of the architects in adapting them. They are presented below in an approximate chronological order, as far as possible.

Ornaments characteristic of the Toulouse Renaissance 
Renaissance architecture can hardly be dissociated from sculpted ornament. Among the decorative attributes usually associated with the Renaissance, there are some that have experienced a particular vigour or diversity in Toulouse. They bear witness to the aspirations of owners always in search of scholarly references as well as to the artistic vitality of the city.

Mottos in Latin 
Several owners have decorated their newly built Renaissance hotel with Latin motto. For example, in Hôtel de Bernuy SI DEUS PRO NOBIS (the beginning of a phrase from the Bible meaning "If God be for us, who can be against us?"), at the Hôtel du Vieux-Raisin VIVITUR INGENIO CAETERA MORTIS ERUNT ("Genius lives on, all else is mortal"), at the Hôtel d'Aymès NE TE QUAESIVERIS EXTRA ("Do not seek outside yourself"), at the Hôtel Dumay TEMPORE ET DILIGENTIA ("By time and industry"), at the Hôtel d'Ulmo DURUM PACIENTIA FRANGO ("By patience I break what is hard"), at the Hôtel Dahus-Tournoer ESTO MICHI DOMINE TURRIS FORTITUDINIS A FACIE INIMICI ("Be for me, Lord, a tower of strength against the enemy"), at the Hôtel Molinier SUSTINE, ABSTINE ("Bear, and forbear"). In the courtyard of the Hôtel Delpech, eight windows built between 1554 and 1560 bear Latin inscriptions taken from the Bible, the most legible of which reads as follows: QUI TIMENT DOMINUM NON ERUNT INCREDIBILES VERBO ILLIUS ("They that fear the Lord will not be incredulous to his word").

First ornaments of the Renaissance 
Pilasters, candelabra, scrolls, grotesques, margent, horns of plenty and other designs from Italy first replaced the Gothic decorations. Certain figures crossed the century: the putti (cherubs) can be found in the Hôtel du Vieux-Raisin (1520s), the Hôtel de Bernuy and the Hôtel de Tournoer (1530s), the Hôtel de Molinier (1552) and the Hôtel de Clary (around 1610); the same goes for the lion mufles used as gargoyles, inspired by those of ancient temples such as the Maison Carrée in Nîmes.

Portraits in medallion 
In a 16th-century marked by humanism and antiquarian culture, the owners did not hesitate to be represented as Roman emperors in medallions carved in stone, evocative of the ancient coins and medals collected by humanists. It was on the tower of the Hôtel du Vieux-Raisin that the owner Bérenguier Maynier, capitoul and parliamentarian, had medallions made for the first time in Toulouse (between 1515 and 1528). The Toulouse prelate and humanist Jean de Pins, ambassador to Milan, Venice and Rome, played a major role in the introduction of Italian models by having the courtyard of his hotel decorated around 1528 with heads sculpted in medallions. The next owner of this same Hôtel de Pins had other medallions made in 1545, attributed to Nicolas Bachelier, six of which were reused in the courtyard of the Hôtel Thomas de Montval. Their framing composed of a vegetal crown, referred to as "triumphal garland" in surviving documents, refers to the Roman triumphs (laurel) but also to the arms of the merchant of the 16th century. The manner of Nicolas Bachelier is distinguished in the treatment of the very prominent eyebrow arches and the very often thick lips of his characters.

After 1540 an evolution led to unframed busts, as on the tower of the Hôtel de Brucelles built in 1544. This type of decoration then became rarer, replaced in the middle of the 16th century by the Classical orders.

Classical orders 
Although several ornaments considered to be in the antique style (scrolls, candelabra, putti, medallions) were a great success as early as 1520, capitals referring directly to Classical orders, taken from book quotations, were carved in the 1530s.

The Ionic order of the gallery of the Hôtel de Pins, built around 1530, is thus taken from the edition of the Treatise of Vitruvius published by Cesariano in 1521. The design of its scroll is still imperfect, but this early manifestation of Vitruvian architecture must be credited to the commissioner, who had a brilliant diplomatic career in Milan at the time Cesariano was working on its edition. The Corinthian order first appeared in Toulouse on the windows of the courtyard of the Hôtel de Bernuy (1530–1536), while the Doric order appeared on the windows and staircase of the Hôtel de Bagis (1538).

The Hôtel de Lamamye is the first manifestation in Toulouse (around 1540) of the elevation of the three superimposed ancient orders: Doric on the lower floor, Ionic in the middle, and Corinthian on the upper floor.

At the Hôtel d'Assézat (1555–1556), the superimposition of orders over the entire height of the elevation and the presence of an attic evokes the model of the Colosseum, which was distributed through Serlio. The original use of twin columns in the city is in keeping with the search for an "enrichment" aesthetic that follows the ancient model, while echoing the mid-century architecture of the kingdom's greats. As the careful treatment of the shafts and capitals underlines, the most sophisticated antique expression systematically nourished the sculptor's invention. Doric is, for example, through Serlio or Labacco, an allusion to his most ornate known version, that of the Basilica Aemilia.

The Caryatid order 

After 1540, Renaissance door and window frames were often the expression of the Caryatid order, an evolution of the classical style. These anthropomorphic supports, in terms (armless and sheathed) or in the form of telamons and caryatids (carrying a load or an entablature with their arms, often also sheathed), were spectacularly realised in Toulouse. Inspired by the stuccoes of the royal castles of Madrid and Fontainebleau and by architectural treatises such as those of Philibert Delorme, Jacques Androuet du Cerceau and Marcantonio Raimondi, they were used for several decades.

The sculptors of Toulouse adopted conventions that made it difficult to attribute authorship of the works: hairstyles and faces of Venus for women, beard and frowning eyebrows for men. These works are inspired by Michelangelo's terribilità but also by a literary and erudite knowledge of the chryselephantine Zeus of Olympia to which the sculptor Phidias had given tenebrous eyebrows taken from the verses of Homer. For this reason, many of these works were later attributed to the architect and sculptor Nicolas Bachelier, who, according to legend (certainly unfounded), was a pupil of the great Michelangelo. These uncertain attributions have posed and continue to pose difficulties in dating the works. Thus Historians are still debating the age of the most emblematic portal of this type: that of the courtyard of the Hôtel de Bagis (or Hôtel de Pierre) with the famous old telamons. Dated to 1538 and attributed to Nicolas Bachelier for some, to the beginning of the 17th century and the workshop of Pierre Souffron for others, a more recent publication now mentions the decade 1550 and a resemblance with engravings of the fireplaces of the Château de Madrid (destroyed). The same doubt hangs over the spectacular windows of the Hôtel du Vieux-Raisin: do they date from the owner Jean Burnet (from 1547), clerk at the Parliament of Toulouse, or from the Bishop of Lombez Pierre de Lancrau, which would rather date them from 1580 to 1584?

This interest of the Toulouse Renaissance for telamons and caryatids takes its full magnitude on the windows of the Hôtel du Vieux-Raisin (2nd and 3rd building campaigns). Some telamons equipped with cushions to support their load refer to the myth of the Garden of the Hesperides and to the moment when Heracles cunningly asked Atlas to take up his burden (to support the weight of the sky) for a moment, the time for him to find a cushion for his shoulders. Other characters are human for the upper part of the body while the lower part is totally animal, inspired by the stucco decorations in the King's Gallery at the Château de Fontainebleau. Finally, on some of these telamons and caryatids, heads are represented at the crotch: a grimacing mask for the men, a child's head for the women, between fertility and sexual passions.

Mannerist ornaments 
Mannerist aesthetics, based on the unusual and the association of opposites, where the mineral, plant and animal kingdoms merge, uses refined motifs, polychromy (brick and stone) and ornaments (cabochons, diamond points, masks) evoking luxury, surprise and abundance.

Influenced by the art of Fontainebleau, the Toulouse Mannerist decorations are inspired by the stuccoes of Rosso and the paintings of Primaticcio. This particularly ornate and exuberant art seduced clients as much as the classical orders and was, at the time, considered to be just as classical.

See also 
 French Renaissance architecture
 Renaissance architecture

Bibliography 
 Collective work directed by Pascal Julien, «catalogue de l'exposition Toulouse Renaissance» (“catalogue of the Toulouse Renaissance exhibition”), Somogy éditions d'art, 2018.

Notes

References

External links 
 The content of the interactive terminal on the hôtels particuliers of the "Toulouse Renaissance" exhibition (2018). English version.

Toulouse
Toulouse